Tommy Gray (20 January 1917 – 3 April 2000) was a Scotland international rugby union player. He played at Full Back and Fly-half.

Rugby career

Amateur career

Gray started with Heriots as a graduate of Heriot's College in Edinburgh. He moved to Northampton to play for the Saints in 1947. He later moved back to Edinburgh to play for Heriots.

Provincial career

While with Northampton he played for East Midlands.

International career

Gray played five Services internationals for Scotland between 1942 and 1944.

Gray was capped three times for Scotland. Notably he won the Calcutta Cup against England at Murrayfield Stadium in 1950 by kicking the match-winning conversion.

Outside of rugby

As a King's Own Scottish Borderer, Gray had half of his left foot blown off by an anti-tank shell in the Second World War when in the Netherlands, near Kasteel Blijenbeek. Working for an insurance company, he was posted to Northampton; a town at the centre of the shoe industry. Gray had special boots made and this allowed him to play rugby and also kick conversions and penalties.

References

1917 births
2000 deaths
Heriot's RC players
Northampton Saints players
Rugby union fly-halves
Rugby union fullbacks
Rugby union players from Edinburgh
Scotland international rugby union players
Scottish rugby union players